Robert Vinter (fl. 1388) of Guildford, Surrey, was an English politician.

He was a Member (MP) of the Parliament of England for Guildford in September 1388, 1391 and September 1397.

References

Year of birth missing
Year of death missing
English MPs September 1388
English MPs 1391
Members of Parliament for Guildford
English MPs September 1397